James A. "Jake" Farrow (born October 18, 1972) is an American television writer and retired actor. He wrote for Fox's Arrested Development and two shows on The WB: Off Centre and What I Like About You. He later worked as a writer and producer on several Nickelodeon shows, including Drake & Josh, iCarly, Victorious, Sam & Cat, Henry Danger, Game Shakers, The Adventures of Kid Danger, and Danger Force. As an actor, Farrow is known for the role of Gavin Mitchell on Drake & Josh and for voicing Rex Powers, Robbie Shapiro's ventriloquist dummy character on Victorious.

Early life
Farrow was born in Marin County, California to Janet (née Strell), a high school history teacher and Michael Farrow (1947–2020), an air force pilot. He had an older sister, Melissa "Missy" Klute (née Farrow, 1970–2015).

Career

Acting
From 2004 to 2007, Farrow played the recurring character of Gavin, a strange employee at "The Premiere", in the Nickelodeon series Drake & Josh. Gavin usually played a small part in the episodes of the show, being given relatively humorous lines and embarrassing Drake and Josh. He also appeared in Merry Christmas, Drake & Josh. Farrow reprised the role of Gavin for the iCarly episode "iStart a Fan War".

Writing
Since 2004, Farrow has worked closely with Drake & Josh creator Dan Schneider, and served as a writer for an episode of Drake & Josh. Prior to this, Farrow also wrote the story for an episode of the sitcom What I Like About You (which Schneider co-created with former Friends writer Wil Calhoun) entitled "The Party" from the show's first season.

After Drake & Josh, Farrow worked as a writer and producer on two other Nickelodeon series created by Schneider, iCarly, and Victorious. On Victorious he also voiced the puppet character Rex Powers. Farrow then worked as a writer and producer for the Nickelodeon series Henry Danger, where he has also appeared in three episodes as the voice of Invisible Brad. Farrow has produced and co-written several episodes of the Nickelodeon series Game Shakers. Farrow is also an executive producer and a writer on the Nickelodeon series Danger Force.

Farrow was a credited writer for the Emmy Award-winning television series Arrested Development.

Filmography

As an actor

As a writer
 Jesse (2000)
 Off Centre (2002)
 What I Like About You (2003)
 Drake & Josh (2005)
 Arrested Development (2005)
 iCarly (2007–2012) (also as a producer)
 Victorious (2010–2012) (also as a producer)
 Sam & Cat (2013–2014) (also as a co-executive producer)
 Henry Danger (2014–2015, 2018–2020) (also as a co-executive producer and executive producer)
 The Adventures of Kid Danger (2018)
 Game Shakers (2015–2019) (also as an executive producer)
 Danger Force (2020–present) (also as an executive producer)

Personal life
In 2008, he married his wife Jennifer Sunderland. They live in Los Angeles, California with their two sons.

On August 9, 2015, Farrow's older sister Melissa died of Glioblastoma.

References

External links

American male television actors
American television writers
American male television writers
American people of Norwegian descent
Living people
20th-century American male writers
21st-century American male actors
21st-century American screenwriters
21st-century American male writers
Place of birth missing (living people)
1972 births